Shaneq or Shanaq may refer to:
 Shaneq, Arak
 Shaneq, Delijan